Convolvulus angustissimus is a herb in the family Convolvulaceae.

It blooms between January and December producing pink-white flowers.

It is found on floodplains, along drainage lines and in winter wet depressions in areas along the coast of the South West, Great Southern and Goldfields-Esperance regions of Western Australia where it grows in calcareous sandy loam to sandy-clay soils over ironstone.

References

angustissimus
Plants described in 1810
Taxa named by Robert Brown (botanist, born 1773)